Sarthalla / Saharthalla ( سہارتھلہ ) is a village located in Khadamabad, Tehsil Dadyal, Mirpur District, Azad Kashmir, Pakistan.

Sarthalla is a Mouzia of tehsil Dadyal and is a part of Union council Ankar. There are many villages in "Mouzia" Saharthalla like Dhoke-Mahiyyan,  Dhoke-Mohrri, Dhoke-Ghurrha. Mouzia Chak Miyan Sharaf-sha and Mouzia Chak-Bopa both of them are located next to it.

Populated places in Mirpur District